In the political systems of Hong Kong, a functional constituency is a professional or special interest group involved in the electoral process. Eligible voters in a functional constituency may include natural persons as well as other designated legal entities such as organisations and corporations. (See: legal personality)

History 
The concept of functional constituencies (FC) in Hong Kong was first developed in the release of "Green Paper: A Pattern of District Administration in Hong Kong" on 18 July 1984 when indirect elections were introduced to the Legislative Council for the first time. The paper suggested that the Legislative Council create 24 seats with 12 seats from different professional interest groups. The 11 original functional constituencies created in 1985 were:

 First Commercial (HKGCC)
 Second Commercial (CGCC)
 First Industrial (FHKI)
 Second Industrial (CMAHK) 
 Financial (HKAB)
 Labour (2 seats)
 Social Services (HKCSS) 
 Medical (HKMA)
 Teaching 
 Legal 
 Engineering, Architectural, Surveying and Planning

In 1988, the Financial constituency was enlarged into Financial and Accountancy constituencies and the Medical constituency was enlarged into Medical and Health Care constituencies respectively.

In 1991, the functional constituencies were more developed. With 9 directly elected geographical constituencies created, 20 functional constituencies consisting of 11 types of industry in which 7 new functional constituencies including Heung Yee Kuk, Urban Council and Regional Council were also set up. The 7 new functional constituencies added in 1991 were:

 Engineering
 Real Estate and Construction
 Tourism
 Financial Services
 Urban Council
 Regional Council
 Rural

In 1992, Chris Patten suggested additional political reform adding nine additional functional constituencies with a much expanded voter base to the existing system. The changes were implemented in the 1995 legislative election. The 9 new functional constituencies added in 1995 were:

 Primary Production, Power and Construction
 Textiles and Garment
 Manufacturing
 Import and Export
 Wholesale and Retail
 Hotels and Catering
 Transport and Communication
 Financing, Insurance, Real Estate and Business Services
 Community, Social and Personal Services

After transfer of sovereignty over Hong Kong in 1997, there were 28 functional constituencies consisting of the following. Corporate voting was restored after it was abolished in 1995. It reduced the number of eligible voters by almost 90 percent, from over 1.1 million in 1995 to fewer than 140,000 in 1998:

 Heung Yee Kuk
 Agriculture and Fisheries
 Insurance
 Transport
 Education
 Legal
 Accountancy
 Medical
 Health Services
 Engineering
 Architectural, Surveying, Planning and Landscape
 Labour (3 seats)
 Social Welfare
 Real Estate and Construction
 Tourism
 Commercial (First)
 Commercial (Second)
 Industrial (First)
 Industrial (Second)
 Finance
 Financial Services
 Sports, Performing Arts, Culture and Publication
 Import and Export
 Textiles and Garment
 Wholesale and Retail
 Information Technology
 Urban Council*
 Regional Council*

The Labour constituency returns 3 seats and the others return one each.

By 2000, the seat held by Urban Council and Regional Council were dissolved by Chief Executive Tung Chee Hwa, the two seats were replaced by Catering and District Council. The District Council would be renamed to District Council (First) by 2012, as a result of the addition of a special Functional Constituency having candidates from District Council but with a different range of electors, named District Council (Second).

In 2021, the National People's Congress initiated a decision to change the electoral rule in Hong Kong. As a result of this decision, the five District Council (Second) seats were abolished alongside the District Council (First) and Information Technology constituencies, while Health Services was merged with Medical to form the Medical and Health Service FC. Three new constituencies were created, namely the Commercial (Third), the Technology and Innovation, and the HKSAR deputies to the National People's Congress, HKSAR members of the National Committee of the Chinese People's Political Consultative Conference, and representatives of relevant national organisations.

The following table charts the evolution of functional constituencies of the LegCo:

Present 
Under the 2021 Hong Kong electoral changes, 28 functional constituencies (FC) return 30 members. The Labour Functional Constituency returns three members by plurality block voting. The other FCs return one member each with first-past-the-post voting. 

The electoral base is non-uniform, and there may be institutional votes or individual votes. Fourteen seats were uncontested in 2008; of the 16 contested seats, the number of electors, corporate and individuals combined, ranged from between 112 and 52,894 voters. Four of the FC legislators – mostly those returned in fiercely contested elections – are aligned with the parties which support universal suffrage; two are independent and the rest (24) are pro-government.

The Standing Committee of the National People's Congress (NPCSC) refers to the participation of the business block vote in the affairs of Hong Kong as "balanced participation". On 26 April 2004, the NPCSC published its decision that:

In 2021, the Government published details of the electoral base of the functional constituencies as follows:

Criticisms 

Pro-democracy supporters criticise the functional constituency system for giving a minority too much power and influence. The right of corporations and legal entities to vote is also controversial, as it gives some individuals multiple votes. For example, in 1998, Sino Group chairman Robert Ng and companies he controlled held roughly 3-4% of the votes in the real estate constituency, according to an analysis by the Hong Kong Human Rights Monitor; they described this as being equivalent in voting power to 15,940 people in a geographical constituency.

In some functional constituencies, the entire body of eligible voters comprises legal entities that are not natural persons. This is known as corporate voting.

In 2009, there were applications for judicial review to challenge the legality of corporate voting on the grounds that it contravened the right to vote enshrined in Article 26 of the Basic Law or was discriminatory in nature. Mr. Justice Andrew Cheung (as the Chief Justice then was) dismissed the applications, emphasising that his judgment was solely concerned with the constitutionality of corporate voting rather than the political wisdom of corporate voting or functional constituencies.

There have been calls to abolish the functional constituencies from pan democrats. The May 2010 by-election was triggered by the resignation of 5 pan-democrats from the Legislative Council who put themselves up for re-election to the Legislative Council. The 'Five Constituencies Referendum' concept to use a by-election as a de facto referendum on universal suffrage and the abolition of functional constituencies was hatched by the League of Social Democrats.

Reform proposals 
Following the consultations on the 2009 political reform package, where an additional five legislative seats for District Councils were proposed (in addition to Geographical seats) the government unveiled the revised package in mid-April 2010. It was proposed that the five additional Legco seats for the district council constituencies will be elected by proportional representation instead of block voting. With the proposals looking likely to be vetoed, the Democratic Party said they would support the measures if the five new District Council functional seats, and the one existing seat, would return candidates nominated by district councillors and elected by all registered voters.

See also 
 Corporatism
 Indirectly elected member (Macau)
 List of constituencies of Hong Kong
 Rotten and pocket boroughs
 Suffrage#Business vote
 Vocational panels in Ireland

References

External links 
 Legislative Council of Hong Kong

Politics of Hong Kong